Gary – New Duluth is a neighborhood in Duluth, Minnesota, United States.  Although called Gary–New Duluth by most people in the area, and even identified by local traffic signs as being so named, they are two separate neighborhood communities.

Commonwealth Avenue (State Highway 23), Becks Road (County Road 3), and Gary Street are three of the main routes in the community.

The neighborhood of Gary begins as one enters under the railroad bridge on Commonwealth Avenue and ends at Gary Builders Supply. Gary contains most of the business district of the two neighborhoods, such as the Minit Mart and Milk House areas.

The neighborhood of New Duluth begins just past Gary Builders Supply, where an old railroad line once crossed Commonwealth Avenue and continues to the Boy Scout Landing at the very end of Commonwealth Avenue.  This railroad track is still visible under the sign for Gary Builders Supply.  The major tenants of New Duluth are the Minneapolis Electric Company's steel foundry and Stowe Elementary School.

Both neighborhoods are historically linked to the once vast U.S. Steel plant of the Duluth Works which was once located outside of Gary and in between Morgan Park. Gary was named for Elbert Henry Gary, founding chairman of U.S. Steel, who was also the namesake of Gary, Indiana. Both neighborhoods experienced a major decline in business and population when the areas industries folded, although much of the ethnic heritage of the communities still thrives to this day.

Sargent Creek flows through at the western edge of the neighborhood.  It serves as a boundary line between Gary–New Duluth and the Fond du Lac neighborhood.

The Oliver Bridge across the Saint Louis River and McCuen Street (MN 39) together connect the neighborhood of Gary–New Duluth with the nearby village of Oliver, Wisconsin.

Adjacent neighborhoods

(Directions following those of Duluth's general street grid system, not actual geographical coordinates)

Smithville (north)
Morgan Park (north)
Fond du Lac (west)
Midway Township (north, west)
Village of Oliver, Wisc. (east)

External links and references
City of Duluth website
City map of neighborhoods (PDF)

Duluth–Superior metropolitan area
Neighborhoods in Duluth, Minnesota